Lee Dong-soo (born 7 June 1974) is a former badminton player from South Korea who affiliate with the Samsung Electro-Mechanics.

Competition
Lee competed for Korea in badminton at the 2004 Summer Olympics in men's doubles with partner Yoo Yong-sung. They defeated José Antonio Crespo and Sergio Llopis of Spain in the first round and Luluk Hadiyanto and Alvent Yulianto of Indonesia in the second.  In the quarterfinals, Lee and Yoo beat Choong Tan Fook and Lee Wan Wah of Malaysia 11-15, 15-11, 15-9.  They won the semifinal against Jens Eriksen and Martin Lundgaard Hansen of Denmark 9-15, 15-5, 15-3 but lost the final to fellow Koreans Kim Dong-moon and Ha Tae-kwon 15-11, 15-4 to finish with the silver medal.

Achievements

Olympic Games 
Men's doubles

World Championships 
Men's doubles

World Cup 
Men's doubles

Asian Games 
Men's doubles

Mixed doubles

Asian Championships 
Men's doubles

East Asian Games
Men's doubles

Mixed doubles

IBF World Grand Prix 
The World Badminton Grand Prix sanctioned by International Badminton Federation (IBF) since 1983.

Men's doubles

Mixed doubles

IBF International 
Men's doubles

References

External links
The-Sports.org profile

South Korean male badminton players
1974 births
Living people
Badminton players from Seoul
Badminton players at the 2000 Summer Olympics
Badminton players at the 2004 Summer Olympics
Olympic badminton players of South Korea
Olympic silver medalists for South Korea
Olympic medalists in badminton
Medalists at the 2000 Summer Olympics
Medalists at the 2004 Summer Olympics
Badminton players at the 1998 Asian Games
Badminton players at the 2002 Asian Games
Asian Games gold medalists for South Korea
Asian Games silver medalists for South Korea
Asian Games bronze medalists for South Korea
Asian Games medalists in badminton
Medalists at the 1998 Asian Games
Medalists at the 2002 Asian Games
World No. 1 badminton players